Giannis Ioannou (born 9 April 1984) is a Greek professional footballer who plays as a defender.

Career
Ioannou has spent most of his career playing for Panachaiki.

He signed with Panetolikos in the summer of 2012 and helped the team gain promotion to the 2013–2014 Greek Superleague.  As his contract was not renewed, he signed with Panegialios in the summer of 2013.

External links
Profile at myplayer.gr
Profile at epae.gr

1984 births
Living people
Greek footballers
Panachaiki F.C. players
Olympiacos Volos F.C. players
Vyzas F.C. players
Panetolikos F.C. players
Panegialios F.C. players
Association football defenders
People from Boeotia
Footballers from Central Greece